Robert Dingley (died 7 February 1395), of Wolverton, Hampshire, was an English politician.

He was a Member (MP) of the Parliament of England for Wiltshire in May 1394.

References

1395 deaths
English MPs 1394
People from Basingstoke and Deane
Year of birth unknown